Ghosal or Ghoshal is an Indian surname, commonly found among Brahmins originating from the Bengal region of the Indian subcontinent.

Ghosal
 Nandini Ghosal, Indian dancer
 Saurav Ghosal (born 1986), Indian squash player
 Soukarya Ghosal (born 1986), Indian film director, lyricist, animator and screenwriter

Ghoshal
 Anup Ghoshal (born 1945), Indian Rabindra Sangeet singer
 Chaiti Ghoshal (fl. 1993–2012), Bengali film and television actress
 Malati Ghoshal (1902–1984), Indian Rabindra Sangeet singer
 Kalipada Ghoshal (1906–1995), artist from Calcutta
 Ranjon Ghoshal (1955–2020), founder of the Bangla band Moheener Ghoraguli
 Shreya Ghoshal (born 1984), Indian singer
 Sumantra Ghoshal (1948–2004), academic in the field of management
 Panchanan Ghoshal (1907–1990), Bengali writer, criminologist and social worker
Ratna Ghoshal, Bengali film and television actress in India

See also
 Ghoshal (disambiguation)
 17927 Ghoshal, an asteroid

References